War Hill at , is the 106th–highest peak in Ireland on the Arderin scale, and the 129th–highest peak on the Vandeleur-Lynam scale. War Hill is in the far northeastern section of the Wicklow Mountains, in Wicklow, Ireland.  Due to its remote setting, it is usually only accessed as part of a larger hill-walking route taking in other neighbouring peaks such as Djouce or Maulin.  One of the few distinguishing landmarks in the area is the Coffin Stone that lies in the saddle between War Hill and Djouce, whose origon is uncertain.

Naming
According to Irish academic Paul Tempan, the proposed Irish name for War Hill, whilst possible, is not backed up by any Irish attestations. In particular, Bhairr (or Barr) is the Irish term for "top" and usually features as the first word in many Irish language names of mountains – E.g. Baurtregaum (from Irish: Barr Trí gCom; meaning "top of the three hollows"). However Wall Hill is not a "top", but is overshadowed by its taller neighbour, Djouce .

Tempan tentatively suggests that a possible alternative is that there never was an Irish language name and that the source name is the English name, War Hill.  Tempan quotes a letter from 1838 by Irish antiquarian Eugene O'Curry, recording that: "In the Townland of Lackandarragh, in the Powerscourt Parish they shew a place called the Churchyard, but it does not retain the least vestige of either a church or churchyard. Some say that it was the place of sepulture of persons killed in a battle fought between the English troops and the O’Tooles some three hundred years ago. This battle was fought on War Hill, immediately overhanging this Churchyard, on the opposite side of the river".

Geography 
War Hill sits on the northern shoulder of its taller neighbour Djouce.  Wall Hill looks down into the Glensoulan Valley, through which the River Dargle flows eastwards into Powerscourt Waterfall, the highest waterfall in Ireland; northwards across the valley of the River Dargle lies Tonduff and Maulin.

Irish hill-walking author, J.B. Malone once described War Hill as lying in a "bog desert".

Hill walking
Because of its remote setting, War Hill is usually only climbed as part of a "loop route" taking in other neighboring mountains.

A popular route is a 15-kilometre circuit that starts at the Ballinastoe Wood car-park to climb the boarded mountain path to White Hill and then to the base of the summit of Djouce .  However, instead of summiting Djouce, the boardwalk path is followed eastwards to the cliffs above the Powerscourt Waterfalls.  Finally, the loop is closed by walking back up to War Hill via the southern side of the Glensoulan Valley and then onto the summit of Djouce itself.  The route then follows back to Ballinastoe Wood via the boardwalk and White Hill.

Another popular variation of this "loop route" are to start in the Crone Woods car-park, and complete a 16-kilometre loop of Maulin , Tonduff , War Hill, and Djouce, and then returning to Crone Woods car-park; this circuit is sometimes called the Circuit of Glensoulan.

Coffin stone

Records from Irish Mountaineering Club note that according to J.B. Malone, these stones were the only natural rock-feature recorded on the old "O.S. Sheet 16, half-inch-to-the-mile map" of Dublin and Wicklow mountains. The large 5-metre collapsed boulder is speculated as being an ancient Irish megalithic portal tomb, or possibly, a glacial erratic.

Bibliography

See also

Wicklow Way
Wicklow Mountains
Lists of mountains in Ireland
List of mountains of the British Isles by height
List of Hewitt mountains in England, Wales and Ireland

References

External links
MountainViews: The Irish Mountain Website, War Hill
MountainViews: Irish Online Mountain Database
The Database of British and Irish Hills , the largest database of British Isles mountains ("DoBIH")
Hill Bagging UK & Ireland, the searchable interface for the DoBIH

Mountains and hills of County Wicklow
Geography of County Wicklow
Hewitts of Ireland